Kocsord is a village in Szabolcs-Szatmár-Bereg county, in the Northern Great Plain region of eastern Hungary.

Geography

2016 mayoral election 
On 8 May 2016, István Földi the Jobbik member won the Kocsord mayoral election.

References

Kocsord